Cedar Grove Cemetery is a nonsectarian cemetery in Flushing, Queens, New York. The cemetery occupies the former Spring Hill estate of colonial governor Cadwallader Colden.

History
It was established in 1893 and is still in operation. When Union Cemetery in Brooklyn closed in 1897, more than 20,000 bodies were disinterred and transferred to Cedar Grove Cemetery. As of 2009, Cedar Grove had recorded a total of 36,000 burials.

Mount Hebron Cemetery was established in 1903 as the Jewish section of Cedar Grove Cemetery and is the burial site of several prominent participants in Yiddish theater.

Cedar Grove was a filming location for cemetery scenes in the 1968 film, Bye Bye Braverman.

Notable burials
 August Claessens (1885–1954), Socialist politician, who served in the New York State Assembly
 Sabrina Grigorian (1956–1986), Italian-born Armenian actress.
 Eddie Leonard (1870–1941), American vaudeville performer

 one British Commonwealth war grave, of a Gunner of the Bermuda Artillery Militia of World War I.

References

External links

 Cedar Grove Cemetery website
 
 

Cemeteries in Queens, New York
Flushing, Queens
1893 establishments in New York (state)